Medusantha is a genus of flowering plants belonging to the family Lamiaceae.

Its native range is Brazil.

Species:

Medusantha carvalhoi 
Medusantha crinita 
Medusantha eriophylla 
Medusantha martiusii 
Medusantha mollissima 
Medusantha multiflora 
Medusantha plumosa 
Medusantha simulans

References

Lamiaceae
Lamiaceae genera